The Neo-Hittite states are sorted according to their geographical position.

All annual details are BC.

The contemporary sources name the language they are written in. Those can be:
 Luwian (always using Luwian hieroglyphs)
 Hittite
 Aramaic
 Phoenician
 Assyrian
 Urartian
 Babylonian
 Hebrew (from Old Testament)

Also post-Neo-Hittite rulers and the Hittite viceroys of Carchemish are listed for completeness. Post-Neo-Hittite rulers are named as such.

Euphrates region

Carchemish (Hittite Karkamissa, Luwian Karkamis) 

For complete dynastic history also the Viceroys of Carchemish from the Hittite empire period are listed here.

Melid (Luwian Malizi)

Kummuh (Luwian Kummaḫa, Classical Commagene)

Masuwari/Til Barsip/Bit-Adini

Antitaurus region, Western Syrian region

Gurgum (Luwian Kurkuma)

Pattin/Unqi/Palistin

Hamath (Luwian Imat)

Central and South-Eastern Anatolian region

Tabal 

Divides into Tabal "Proper" and other localities.

Tabal/Bit-Burutaš (Classical Cappadocia)

Atuna (Luwian Tunna)

Ištunda/Ištuanda

Šinuḫtu

Tuwana (Classical Tyanitis)

Ḫupišna (Classical Cybistra)

Kulummu/Til-garimmu

Kaška

Cilicia

Que (Luwian Adanawa/Hiyawa, Classical Cilicia of the Plain)

Hilakku (Classical Rough Cilicia)

Tanakun

Illubru

Kundu and Sizzu

Pirindu/Piriddu

Aramaean region

Bit-Agusi/Arpad

Y'adiya/Bit-Gabbari

Sam'al/Siri'laya (Zincirli)

Kasku/Kaska/Ktk

Zobah

Aram-Damascus

Notes

References

See also 
 List of Hittite kings

Neo-Hittite states